Sandy Lake is a borough in eastern Mercer County, Pennsylvania, United States. It was established in 1849. The population was 649 at the 2020 census. It is part of the Youngstown–Warren metropolitan area.

Geography
Sandy Lake is located at  (41.351165, -80.083220).

Demographics

As of the census of 2000, there were 743 people, 298 households, and 211 families residing in the borough. The population density was 896.4 people per square mile (345.6/km2). There were 330 housing units at an average density of 398.1 per square mile (153.5/km2). The racial makeup of the borough was 99.33% White, 0.13% African American, 0.40% Asian, and 0.13% from two or more races. Hispanic or Latino of any race were 0.13% of the population.

There were 298 households, out of which 36.2% had children under the age of 18 living with them, 55.0% were married couples living together, 14.4% had a female householder with no husband present, and 28.9% were non-families. 24.5% of all households were made up of individuals, and 10.7% had someone living alone who was 65 years of age or older. The average household size was 2.49 and the average family size was 2.94.

In the borough the population was spread out, with 26.6% under the age of 18, 7.8% from 18 to 24, 27.3% from 25 to 44, 21.0% from 45 to 64, and 17.2% who were 65 years of age or older. The median age was 37 years. For every 100 females there were 85.8 males. For every 100 females age 18 and over, there were 87.9 males.

The median income for a household in the borough was $34,231, and the median income for a family was $38,958. Males had a median income of $32,159 versus $19,712 for females. The per capita income for the borough was $15,460. About 12.7% of families and 16.6% of the population were below the poverty line, including 30.0% of those under age 18 and 11.6% of those age 65 or over.

Notable person
 Terry Turner, professional baseball player

References

Populated places established in 1849
Boroughs in Mercer County, Pennsylvania
1849 establishments in Pennsylvania